Willem "Wim" Pool (born 20 March 1927) is a Dutch former sprint canoer who competed in the late 1940s. At the 1948 Summer Olympics in London, he finished sixth in the K-2 1000 m event. He was born in Amsterdam.

References
Wim Pool's profile at Sports Reference.com
 

1927 births
Possibly living people
Canoeists at the 1948 Summer Olympics
Dutch male canoeists
Olympic canoeists of the Netherlands
Sportspeople from Amsterdam
20th-century Dutch people